WLVU may refer to:

 WLVU (FM) 97.1 MHz, a radio station in Belle Meade, Tennessee, United States
 WLVO (FM) 88.5 MHz, a radio station in  Halifax, Pennsylvania, United States that previously held the WLVU callsign
 WSUN (FM) 97.1 MHz, a radio station in Holiday, Florida, United States that also previously held the WLVU callsign at 106.3 MHz
 WXKC 99.3 MHz, a radio station in Erie, Pennsylvania that held the call letters until 1985